Herfelingen is a village in the municipality of Herne in the Belgian province of Flemish Brabant. It was a municipality itself until the fusion of the municipalities in 1977.

Populated places in Flemish Brabant